West Bandits Solo is an Indonesian professional basketball team that competes in the Indonesian Basketball League.

Notable players
- Set a club record or won an individual award as a professional player.
- Played at least one official international match for his senior national team at any time.
  Mei Joni
  Pringgo Regowo
  Widyanta Putra Teja

References

External links
Presentation at Asia-basket.com

Basketball teams established in 2018
Basketball teams in Indonesia
Sport in Central Java
Surakarta